Mbale is a city in the Eastern Region of Uganda. It is the main municipal, administrative, and commercial center of Mbale District and the surrounding sub-region.

Location

The coordinates of the city are 1°04'50.0"N, 34°10'30.0"E (Latitude:1.080556; Longitude:34.175000). The city also lies on the railway from Tororo to Pakwach.

Population
According to the 2002 national census, the population of Mbale was about 71,130. In 2010, the Uganda Bureau of Statistics (UBOS) estimated the population at 81,900. In 2011, UBOS estimated the mid-year population at 91,800. In 2014, the national population census put the population at 96,189.

Twinning

Points of interest

The following points of interest lie within the city limits or close to its borders:

Administrative
 The headquarters of Mbale District Administration
 The offices of Mbale City Council

Public facilities
 Mbale central market
 Mbale Municipal Stadium

Military
 The headquarters of the 3rd Division of the Uganda People's Defense Force

Health facilities
 Mbale Regional Referral Hospital - a 400-bed public hospital administered by the Uganda Ministry of Health
 CURE Children's Hospital of Uganda - a 42-bed private neurosurgery hospital, owned and administered by CURE International

Educational institutions
 Uganda Christian University College -  Headquartered at Mukono UCU formerly Bishop Tucker Theological College 
 Busitema University Faculty of Health Sciences - the medical school of Busitema University, a public institution of higher education
 The main campus of the Islamic University in Uganda
 The Mbale Campus of Uganda Martyrs University - a private university, whose headquarters are located in Nkozi, Mpigi District
 LivingStone International University - a private university affiliated with the fellowship of Christian Churches and Churches of Christ
 Mbale School of Clinical Officers

Financial institutions

 Absa Bank Uganda Limited
 Bank of Africa Uganda Limited
 Mbale Currency Center
 Centenary Bank
 DFCU Bank
 Diamond Trust Bank (Uganda)
 Equity Bank Uganda Limited
 Finance Trust Bank
 Housing Finance Bank
 KCB Bank Uganda Limited
 National Social Security Fund
 PostBank Uganda
 Stanbic Bank Uganda Limited

City status
In 2019 the Cabinet of Uganda, resolved to award Mbale, city status effective July 2021. In November of the same year, Cabinet revised the date of city status to 1 July 2020.

Notable people
John Wasikye: Anglican Bishop, was Murdered After Liberation of Kampala, April 11, 1979 
James Wapakhabulo: Politician
Lydia Wanyoto: Lawyer, politician and diplomat.
Nathan Nandala Mafabi: Ugandan accountant, lawyer, and politician. He represents Budadiri County West in Sironko District in the Parliament of Uganda. From May 2011 until January 2014, he was the leader of the opposition.
Walter de Sousa Field Hockey player for Indian hockey team. He was born in Mbale, Uganda and spent his early childhood here where his father was working under the colonial administration.

See also 
 Gisu people
 Gisu language
 Mbale Kenya
 Railway stations in Uganda
 Bugisu Co-operative Union Limited
 List of cities and towns in Uganda

References

External links 

 About Mbale
 Climbing Mount Elgon

Noun
1. a humble man of honor, respected towards others.
2. a plate 
3. Helper, Giver or Flower

 
Populated places in Eastern Region, Uganda
Cities in the Great Rift Valley
Jewish communities
Jewish Ugandan history
Mbale District
Bugisu sub-region